Panti, Rory O'Neill, is an Irish drag queen and gay rights activist

Panti may also refer to:

Geography
Panti, Allahabad village in Allahabad, Uttar Pradesh, India
Panti, district of Pasaman Regency, West Sumatra, Indonesia
Cabang Panti, gibbon research station in the Gunung Palung National Park, West Sumatra, Indonesia
Panti Usu a mountain in the Andes of southern Peru
Panti Rapih Hospital hospital in Yogyakarta, Indonesia
Mount Panti, List of mountains in Malaysia
Panti Bird Sanctuary (formerly known as Panti Forest Reserve) on the Kota Tinggi Bypass at the headwaters of Sungai Johor, Linggiu and Ulu Sedili, Malaysia
Panti' in Chickasaw mythology, a fabulous beast with exceptionally lovely teeth which it will exchange for lost baby teeth

People
Elijio Panti (1893-1996), Belizean traditional healer
Tuvia Panti, titular character of Viktor von Strauß und Torney's tragicomic novella Mitteilungen aus den Akten betreffend den Zigeuner Tuvia Panti aus Ungarn (1871)